Live at The Tabernacle is a live DVD concert of the band, Widespread Panic, filmed at The Tabernacle in Atlanta, GA between January 27–29, 2012.

Track listing

January 27, 2012

Disc one
 Heaven
 Send Your Mind
 Surprise Valley
 I'm Not Alone
 Weak Brain
 Pickin' Up The Pieces
 Fixin' To Die
 Blackout Blues
 Travelin' Light

Disc two
 Let's Get Down to Business
 Who Do You Belong To?
 Henry Parson's Died
 Visiting Day
 Use Me
 Diner 
 Ribs and Whiskey

Disc three
 Nobody's Loss
 Smokestack Lightning
 Big Wooly Mammoth
 North
 Up All Night
 Chunk of Coal
 Can't Find My Way Home

January 28, 2012

Disc one
 Porch Song
 Space Wrangler
 Walk On
 Papa Johnny Road
 Coach
 Time Zones
 Vacation
 Pilgrims
 Imitation Leather Shoes
 Ain't Life Grand
 Weight of the World
 Gradle

Disc two
 Holden Oversoul
 Me and The Devil
 Quarter Tank of Gasoline
 Driving Song
 City of Dreams
 Driving Song
 No Sugar Tonight/New Mother Nature
 Expiration Day
 Tall Boy
 Many Rivers To Cross

January 29, 2012

Disc one
 Papa's Home
 Wondering
 Hope In a Hopeless World
 Counting Train Cars
 Help Me Somebody
 Trouble
 Hatfield
 Ballad of John and Yoko
 Climb to Safety

Disc two
 Pleas
 Can't Get High
 Ain't No Use
 Blue Indian
 Carmelita
 Degenerate
 Fishing
 This Cruel Thing

Disc three
 Jack
 Chilly Water
 Going Out West
 C. Brown
 Blight
 End Of The Show

Personnel

Widespread Panic
John Bell — Vocals, Guitar
John "JoJo" Hermann— Keyboards, Vocal
Jimmy Herring - Guitar
Todd Nance — Drums, Vocals
Domingo S. Ortiz - Percussion, Vocals
Dave Schools - Bass, Vocals

Guest musicians 
 Colonel Bruce Hampton featured on "Fixin' To Die" (January 27, 2012)
 Colin Vereen featured on "Trouble" (January 29, 2012)
 John Keane featured on "Blue Indian" and "Carmelita" (January 29, 2012)

Widespread Panic video albums
2012 live albums
2012 video albums
Live video albums